Merle Soppela (born 1991) is a retired Finnish alpine ski racer.

She competed at the 2015 World Championships in Beaver Creek, USA, in the giant slalom.

References

1991 births
Living people
People from Rovaniemi
Finnish female alpine skiers
Sportspeople from Lapland (Finland)